Ystad Municipality is a municipality in Scania County in southern Sweden. Its seat is the town of Ystad. The present municipality was created in 1971 by the amalgamation of the former City of Ystad with four surrounding municipalities.

Localities

There were ten localities in the municipality as of 2018.

International relations

Twin towns — sister cities
Ystad is twinned with:
 Druskininkai
 Świnoujście
 Haugesund
 Ballerup

References

External links 

Ystad Municipality - Official site
Österlen - Official site
Kurt Wallander English Language site for fans of Henning Mankell's detective series, including information on, and photographs of, Ystad
Branagh's Wallander - Website relating to the BBC's English language Wallander starring Kenneth Branagh

 
Municipalities of Skåne County